East Ham South was a parliamentary constituency centred on the East Ham district of London, which was in Essex until 1965.  It returned one Member of Parliament (MP) to the House of Commons of the Parliament of the United Kingdom, elected by the first past the post voting system.

History 

The constituency was created by the Representation of the People Act 1918 for the 1918 general election.  It was abolished for the February 1974 general election.

Boundaries
The seat was established in 1918, as a division of the County Borough of East Ham in the south western part of the historic county of Essex. It comprised the Beckton and North Woolwich, Central East and Central West wards.

By the time of the next major redistribution of parliamentary seats, which took effect in 1950, East Ham had been re-warded. The constituency then comprised Castle, Central, Greatfield, South and Wall End wards.

In 1965 East Ham was joined with other districts to form the London Borough of Newham in Greater London. It is part of east London.

In the 1974 redistribution the constituency was abolished and its area included in the new Newham North East seat.

Members of Parliament

Elections

Elections in the 1910s

Elections in the 1920s

Elections in the 1930s

Elections in the 1940s

Elections in the 1950s

Elections in the 1960s

Elections in the 1970s

References

 

Parliamentary constituencies in London (historic)
Constituencies of the Parliament of the United Kingdom established in 1918
Constituencies of the Parliament of the United Kingdom disestablished in 1974
Politics of the London Borough of Newham
History of the London Borough of Newham
East Ham